A list of films produced in Hong Kong in 1978:.

1978

External links
 IMDB list of Hong Kong films
 Hong Kong films of 1978 at HKcinemamagic.com

1978
Hong Kong
Films